Cephalotes cordatus is a species of arboreal ant of the genus Cephalotes, characterized by an odd shaped head and the ability to "parachute" by steering their fall if they drop off of the tree they're on. Giving their name also as gliding ants. The species is native across the north of South America, from the Brazilian state of Minas Gerais to Venezuela, as well as in Bolivia, Peru and Ecuador. Their larger and flatter legs, a trait common with other members of the genus Cephalotes, gives them their gliding abilities.

The species was first given a description and a classification by British entomologist Frederick Smith in 1853.

References

cordatus